Sealdah may refer to:
 Sealdah, a neighbourhood of central Kolkata, India
 Sealdah railway station, a major railway station in Kolkata, West Bengal, India
 Sealdah (Vidhan Sabha constituency), an assembly constituency in West Bengal, India